also Higaonna Kanjun (14 October 1882–24 January 1963) was a Japanese scholar who specialized in the history of Okinawa. Alongside Iha Fuyū and Majikina Ankō, he is considered one of the pioneers of modern Okinawan studies. After reading Japanese history at Tokyo Imperial University, where he wrote his dissertation on the approach of the Shimazu clan towards the Ryūkyū Kingdom, his subsequent career included posts at Hosei University and Takushoku University and travels in Southeast Asia and India. His private collection of documents and historical materials, numbering some 3,384 items, is preserved as the Higashionna Kanjun Collection at Okinawa Prefectural Library.

See also
 List of Cultural Properties of Japan - writings (Okinawa)
 List of Cultural Properties of Japan - historical materials (Okinawa)

References

People from Okinawa Prefecture
Ryukyuan people
Academic staff of Hosei University
1882 births
1963 deaths
Historians of Japan
University of Tokyo alumni
20th-century Japanese historians
Academic staff of Takushoku University